Trapèze is a ballet by Sergei Prokofiev. Closely related to his Quintet, Op. 39 (1924), it contains eight movements(in five parts) and lasts 20–25 minutes. The complete ballet in eight movements was first performed in Gotha, a German town near Hanover, on 6 November 1925.

Background
In 1924, when Prokofiev was staying in Paris, a travelling troupe commissioned a chamber ballet from him. However, the ensemble that provided music accompaniment to the troupe only contained five members. This provided Prokofiev an opportunity to write more chamber music. His most recent chamber piece had been the Overture on Hebrew Themes, Op. 34 (1919).

Later, Prokofiev incorporated the ballet music into two pieces: Quintet, Op. 39 (1924) and Divertissement, Op. 43 (1925–29).

Movements
The Trapèze Ballet, reconstructed in 2002, is in five parts and eight movements:
 Overture
Moderato, molto ritmato
 "Matelote"
Allegro
 "The Ballerina"
Tema con variazioni
Andante energico
 "Dance of the Tumblers"
Allegro sostenuto, ma con brio
Adagio pesante
Allegro precipitato, ma non troppo presto
 "Mourning the Ballerina"
Andantino

The related Quintet is in six movements as follows:
 Tema con variazioni
 Andante energico
 Allegro sostenuto, ma con brio
 Adagio pesante
 Allegro precipitato, ma non troppo presto
 Andantino

See also
 List of ballets by title

References
Notes

Sources
 Press, Stephen D. (2006). Prokofiev's Ballets for Diaghilev . Ashgate Publishing Limited.

External links
 
 Video – Prokofiev Trapèze Ballet/scene (04:05).
 Video – Prokofiev Trapèze Ballet/quintet (22:10).
 Video – Prokofiev Trapèze Ballet/piano (20:45).

Compositions by Sergei Prokofiev
Ballets by Sergei Prokofiev
20th-century classical music
1925 ballet premieres
1924 compositions